Saaletal ("Saale valley") is a former Verwaltungsgemeinschaft ("collective municipality") in the district Burgenlandkreis in Saxony-Anhalt, Germany. It was situated north of Weißenfels. The seat of the Verwaltungsgemeinschaft was in Großkorbetha. It was disbanded in September 2010.

The Verwaltungsgemeinschaft Saaletal consisted of the following municipalities:

 Burgwerben 
 Großkorbetha
 Reichardtswerben 
 Schkortleben 
 Storkau 
 Tagewerben
 Uichteritz 
 Wengelsdorf

References

Former Verwaltungsgemeinschaften in Saxony-Anhalt